The Standard Edition of the Complete Psychological Works of Sigmund Freud is a complete edition of the works of Sigmund Freud, the founder of psychoanalysis. It was translated from the German under the general editorship of James Strachey, in collaboration with Anna Freud, assisted by Alix Strachey and Alan Tyson. The Standard Edition (usually abbreviated as SE) consists of 24 volumes, and it was originally published by the Hogarth Press in London in 1953–1974. Unlike the German Gesammelte Werke, the SE contains critical footnotes by the editors. This editorial material has later been included in the German-language Studienausgabe edition of Freud.

Contents

 Vol. I Pre-Psycho-Analytic Publications and Unpublished Drafts (1886–1899).
 Vol. II Studies in Hysteria (1893–1895). By Josef Breuer and S. Freud.
 Vol. III Early Psycho-Analytic Publications (1893–1899)
 Vol. IV The Interpretation of Dreams (I) (1900)
 Vol. V The Interpretation of Dreams (II) and On Dreams (1900–1901)
 Vol. VI The Psychopathology of Everyday Life (1901)
 Vol. VII A Case of Hysteria, Three Essays on Sexuality and Other Works (1901–1905)
 Vol. VIII Jokes and their Relation to the Unconscious (1905)
 Vol. IX Jensen's 'Gradiva,' and Other Works (1906–1909)
 Vol. X The Cases of 'Little Hans' and the Rat Man' (1909)
 Vol. XI Five Lectures on Psycho-Analysis, Leonardo and Other Works (1910)
 Vol. XII The Case of Schreber, Papers on Technique and Other Works (1911–1913)
 Vol. XIII Totem and Taboo and Other Works (1913–1914)
 Vol. XIV On the History of the Psycho-Analytic Movement, Papers on Meta-psychology and Other Works (1914–1916)
 Vol. XV Introductory Lectures on Psycho-Analysis (Parts I and II) (1915–1916)
 Vol. XVI Introductory Lectures on Psycho-Analysis (Part III) (1916–1917)
 Vol. XVII An Infantile Neurosis and Other Works (1917–1919)
 Vol. XVIII Beyond the Pleasure Principle, Group Psychology and Other Works (1920–1922)
 Vol. XIX The Ego and the Id and Other Works (1923–1925)
 Vol. XX An Autobiographical Study, Inhibitions, Symptoms and Anxiety, Lay Analysis and Other Works (1925–1926)
 Vol. XXI The Future of an Illusion, Civilization and its Discontents and Other Works (1927–1931)
 Vol. XXII New Introductory Lectures on Psycho-Analysis and Other Works (1932–1936)
 Vol. XXIII Moses and Monotheism, An Outline of Psycho-Analysis and Other Works (1937–1939)
 Vol. XXIV Indexes and Bibliographies (Compiled by Angela Richards, 1974)

Bibliography
 The Standard Edition of the Complete Psychological Works of Sigmund Freud. Translated from the German under the General Editorship of James Strachey. In collaboration with Anna Freud. Assisted by Alix Strachey and Alan Tyson, 24 volumes. Vintage, 1999. [Reprint.] 
 

1956 non-fiction books
Hogarth Press books
Series of non-fiction books
Works by Sigmund Freud